Events from the 1450s in Denmark.

Incumbents
 Monarch — King Christian I

 Steward of the Realm – Otte Nielsen Rosenkrantz (1445–52), Niels Eriksen Gyldenstjerne (1453–56), Erik Ottesen Rosenkrantz (1456–1480)

Events
1450
 13 May – Christian I of Denmark becomes King of Norway
 29 August  The Treaty of Bergen is signed in Bergen.

1451
 Brønshøj Church is expanded with a tower.

1454
 The Royal Brewery on Slotsholmen is mentioned for the first time.
 The town of Billund ("Byllundt") is mentioned for the first time.

1455
 June – Denmark enters the Thirteen Years' War when Christian I declares war against Poland and the Prussian Confederation. This means nothing more than a disturbance in trade, however, since Denmark is still busy fighting with Sweden.
 14 September – Christian I confirms Copenhagen's old privileges and orders a refurbishment of its fortifications.

1456
 Christian I reassumes the title of Duke of Estonia in spite of the fact that Danish Estonia was sold in 1446.
 The Battle of Bornholm (1456) takes place near the Danish island of Bornholm, between privateers from the city of Gdańsk (Danzig) and a transport convoy of Danish and Livonian ships which were attempting to bring supplies and reinforcements to the Teutonic Knights in Prussia.

1457
 23 June – Christian I of Denmark becomes King of Sweden

Births
1455
 2 February – John, King of Denmark (died 1513)
1456
 23 June – Margaret of Denmark, Queen of Scotland (died 1486)

Deaths
1459
 c. June – Eric VII, King of Denmark, Norway and Sweden, deposed in 1439 (born c. 1381)
 4 December – Adolphus VIII, Count of Holstein (born 1401)

References

1450s in Denmark